Xu is a Chinese-language surname. In the Wade-Giles system of romanization, it is romanized as "Hsu", which is commonly used in Taiwan. It is different from Xu (surname 徐), which is represented by a different character.

Variations

Other Chinese varieties
In Cantonese, 許/许 is transcribed as Heoi in Jyutping and as Héui in Yale Romanization; customary spellings include Hui, Hoi or Hooi.

In Hokkien, 許/许 is transcribed in Pe̍h-ōe-jī as Khó͘ and in Tâi-lô as Khóo.

In Teochew, 許/许 is spelled as Kóu, and customarily as Koh, Khoh, Khor, Khaw or Ko.

In Fuzhou, 許/许 is spelled as Hii, Hee or Hoo.

In Hakka, 許/许 is spelled as Koo.

Other languages
In Japanese, 許 is transliterated as Yurusu, Bakari, or Moto and in Sino-Japanese as Kyo or Ko.

In Singapore, 許/许 is spelled as See.

In the Yale romanization of Korean, 許 is Heo (허).

In Vietnamese, the character 許 is converted to Hứa. The Hoa people overseas Chinese of Vietnam with the surname 許/许 may have it spelled as Háior Hy when immigrating to the English-speaking World, particularly the United States. Other spellings include Hee and Hu.

In Cebuano and Tagalog, 許 is transliterated as Co and Ngo.

Origins
The surname 許/许 Xǔ has multiple theories regarding its origin.

The most credible one states that the surname Xǔ originated from the feudal state of Xǔ in the area of Xǔchāng, now known as Jian'an District in Xuchang City, of present-day Henan, during the Zhou Dynasty.

A different theory states that the surname originated even earlier with the fabled Xǔ You (许由), a sage in the time of the fabled Emperor Yao, not to be confused with the later another Xǔ You (許攸) who was a military strategist of the warlord Yuan Shao during the late Han Dynasty period. Xǔ You's descendants carried on the surname of their famed ancestor, thereby establishing Xǔ as a surname. Later on in the history of ancient China, it became popular among scholars of the time to postulate that Xǔ You must have been the ancestor of that feudal lord whose surname was Xǔ.

The posterities with state as surname called Xǔ, were authentic known as Xǔ. In tale of Emperor Yao, Xǔ You posterities surname also called Xǔ. Xǔ by handing down was the person of integrity talented person of Yao and Shun time, lives in Jishan. After many years later, the posterity called this mountain as Xǔ Youshan. More than years ago activity near Yu Yingshui the basin under Jishan.
As there are many dialects in Chinese speaking world, there are several spellings of surname Xǔ.

People
 Hsu Shu-ching, b. 1991, Taiwanese weightlifter
Xu Wei Zhou, b. 1994, Chinese actor, singer
Xu Yuan Kai, Benedict, b. 1972, System Operator for Bulletin Boards(BBS) before the internet age and builder of high-end PCs, Pioneer in Domestic Computing Hardware, Emulators and Hackintosh in Singapore.
Xu Shen, b. 58, Han dynasty dictionary compiler
Xu Shao, (許劭; 150-195), commentator
Xu Chu, (許褚 d. 230), Cao Wei general
Xu Gong (許貢; died 200), Governor of Jiang Dong during the Eastern Han  
Lady Xu Mu, first recorded female poet in Chinese history
Xu Xiuzhi, b. 1880, politician
Xu Dishan, b. 1893, author
Xu Shiyou, b. 1906, Chinese general
Kenneth Hsu, b. 1929, scientist
Hsu King Shing, b.1910s–1986, Chinese footballer and manager
Hui Yin-fat, b. 1936, legislative council of Hong Kong (1991—1995), executive council in 1991, provisional legislative council
Hsu Hsin-liang, b. 1941, Taiwanese politician
Michael Hui, b. 1942, filmmaker
Ann Hui, b. 1947, Hong Kong actress, film director, film producer and occasional screenwriter
Samuel Hui, b. 1948, musician and actor
Rafael Hui Si Yan, b. 1948, GBM GBS JP, is a former Chief Secretary for Administration of Hong Kong.
Benz Hui, b. 1948, Hong Kong actor worked on the TV station TVB
Amy Khor, b. 1958, Singapore politician and Senior Minister in government
Andy Hui, (許志安; b. 1967), Hong Kong singer, actor, quarter of Big Four and 1st runner up of the 5th annual New Talent Singing Awards
Ted Hui, (許智峯; b. 1982), Member of the Legislative Council of Hong Kong
Dasmond Koh, b. 1972, radio and TV personality
Koh Chieng Mun, Singaporean actress
Xu Yinchuan, b. 1975, chess XiangQi player
Valen Hsu, b. 1974, singer-songwriter
Hsu Ming-tsai, politician
Xu Yuhua, b. 1976, Chinese chess grandmaster
Hsu Jen-hao, 2012 Taiwanese badminton player
Hsu Wei Lun (1978 – 2007), Taiwanese actress
Evonne Hsu, b. 1979, American-born Taiwanese singer
Peggy Hsu, b. 1981, singer-songwriter
Xu Binshu, b. 1988, Chinese figure skater
Chenyang Xu, Chinese mathematician
Xu Xin, b. 1990, Chinese table tennis player
Xu Anqi, b. 1992, Chinese épée fencer
Hee Yit Foong, politician
Feng-hsiung Hsu, computer scientist and author
Cho-yun Hsu, b. 1930, humanities, historian
Candy Hsu, b. 1998, Taiwanese actress
Shea Jia-dong, b. 1948, Minister of Finance of the Republic of China
 Xu Kai (许凯; born 1995) is a Chinese actor and model
 Xu Jiaqi (许佳琪; born 1995) is a Chinese singer, rapper, dancer and actress. Member of SNH48 and THE9
 Xu Shihui (許世輝; born 1958) is a Chinese billionaire businessman, founder and chairman of Dali Foods Group
 Xu Zhonglin (許仲琳; died 1560) was a Chinese writer who lived in the Ming dynasty
 Xu You (Han dynasty) (許攸; died 204), courtesy name Ziyuan, was an adviser serving under the warlord Yuan Shao during the late Eastern Han dynasty
 Xu Xin (table tennis) (许昕; born 1990) is a Chinese professional table tennis player ranked world No. 1 for men's singles by the International Table Tennis Federation
 Xu Jiayin (许家印; born 9 October 1958), or Hui Ka Yan in Cantonese, is a Chinese billionaire businessman and chairman of Evergrande Group
 Lady Xu Mu (許穆夫人; fl. 7th century BC) was a princess of the State of Wey
 Empress Xu (Cheng) (許皇后) (personal name unknown, but likely Xu Kua [許誇]) (died 8 BC) was an empress during the Han dynasty
 Xu Guangping (許廣平, 1898 – 1968) was a Chinese female writer
 Xu Xuanping (許宣平; Wade–Giles: Hsü Hsüan-p'ing), was a Taoist hermit and poet of the Chinese Tang dynasty
 Beatrice Hsu Wei-lun (Chinese:許瑋倫; 1978 – 2007 (Aged 28)) was a Taiwanese actress
 Xu Jingcheng (許景澄; 1845 – 28 July 1900) was a Chinese diplomat and Qing politician
 Xu Yongyue (许永跃; born 1942 in Zhenping County, Nanyang, Henan) was the Minister of State Security of the People's Republic of China
 Xu Shiying (許世英; 1873 – 1964, also romanized as Hsu Shih-ying) was a Chinese Kuomintang politician who served as Premier
 Xu Zhangrun (许章润; born 1962) is a Chinese jurist. He is a professor of Jurisprudence and Constitutional Law at Tsinghua University
 Xu Yingkui (許應騤; 1830–1903[2][3]), courtesy names Jun'an (筠庵) and Changde (昌德), Qing dynasty politician who served as Viceroy of Min-Zhe
 Xu Leiran (许磊然; 1918 - 26 June 2009) better known by her pen name Leiran, was a Chinese female translator
Hsu Wei-ning (許瑋甯; born 1984), also known as Tiffany Ann Hsu, is a Taiwanese actress
Xu Ningsheng (许宁生; born 1957) is a Chinese physicist who is the current President of Fudan University
 Xu Jiatun (许家屯; 1916 – 2016) was a Chinese politician and dissident. He was the Chinese Communist Party secretary of Jiangsu
 Xu Pingjun (許平君) (89 BC - 71 BC), formally Empress Gong'ai (恭哀皇后) was an empress during Han Dynasty
 Xu Xingde (许兴德; born 1984 in Yunnan) is a Chinese race walker
 Xu Rongmao, JP (許榮茂; born 1950), or Hui Wing Mau in Cantonese, is a Chinese-Australian entrepreneur
 Xu Yuanchong (许渊冲; 許淵冲; 1921–2021, born in Jiangxi) was a translator, best known for translating Chinese ancient poems into English and French
 Vivian Hoo (許嘉雯, born 1990), Malaysian badminton player
 Xu Xing (philosopher) (許行; c. 372 – c. 289 BC) was a Chinese philosopher and one of the most notable advocates of Agriculturalism
 Xu Shoushang (許壽裳; 1883–1948) was a Chinese writer who was one of the co-authors of the Twelve Symbols national emblem in 1912
 Xu Liangying (许良英; born 1920 - 28 January 2013) was a Chinese physicist, translator and a historian
 Xu Li (许莉; born 1989 in Suzhou, Anhui) is a female Chinese freestyle wrestler
 Diana Xu Jidan (许继丹; born 1990) is a Chinese model and beauty pageant titleholder who was crowned Miss China 2012
 Xu Weizhou (许魏洲; born 1994) known internationally as Timmy Xu, is a Chinese actor and singer-songwriter
 Xu Lianjie (許連捷; born 1953), also known as Hui Lin Chit, is a Chinese billionaire businessman, CEO of Hengan International
 Xu Ji (許寂) (d. 936), courtesy name Xianxian (閑閑), was an official of the Chinese Five Dynasties and Ten Kingdoms Period state Former Shu
 Nora Xu or Xu Naiqing (许乃蜻; born 1995 in Luoyang, Henan) is a Chinese model and beauty pageant titleholder who was crowned as Miss Universe China in its 2014 edition
 Xu Dishan (许地山; 許地山; pen name: Luo Huasheng (落華生); 1893 – 1941) was a Taiwan-born Chinese author, translator and folklorist
 Xu Shen (许慎; c. 58 – c. 148 CE) was a Chinese politician, philologist, and writer of the Eastern Han Dynasty
 Xu Guiyuan (许桂源; born 1996) is a Chinese baseball first baseman and outfielder
 Xu Daoning (許道寧; Hsü Tao-ning) (c. 970–1051/53) was a Chinese painter of the Northern Song Dynasty
 Sheu Yu-jer (許虞哲; 1952 – 2020) was a Taiwan politician who was the Minister of Finance
 Xu Aimin (许爱民; born 1957) former Chinese politician who served as Vice-Chairman of Jiangxi Provincial People's Political Consultative Conference
 Xu Jingzong (許敬宗; 592 –, 672, courtesy name Yanzu, posthumously known as Duke Gong of Gaoyang, was a Chinese cartographer, historian, and politician who served as a chancellor in the Tang dynasty
 Sharon Hsu (許維恩; born 1981) is a Taiwanese actress and singer of Dutch descent
 Hsu Shu-ching (許淑淨; born 1991) is a Taiwanese weightlifter
 Amy Khor Lean Suan (许连碹; born 1958) is a Singaporean politician
 Xu Yushi (許圉師) (died 679), formally Duke Jian of Ping'en (平恩簡公), was briefly a chancellor of the Chinese dynasty Tang Dynasty
 Xu Binshu (許斌姝; born 1988 in Changchun, Jilin) is a Chinese figure skater
 Xu Hun (許渾; fl. 800s) a Tang Dynasty poet, was descended from Xu Yushi
 Xu Haifeng (许海峰; born 1957 in Zhangzhou, Fujian) is a male Chinese pistol shooter, and the first person to win a gold medal for China in the Olympic Games
 Hsu Chih-chieh (許智傑) Taiwanese politician who is member of the Democratic Progressive Party
 Xu Ci (許慈; fl. third century), courtesy name Rendu, was an official and scholar of the state of Shu Han in the Three Kingdoms period of China
 Jack Liangjie Xu (许良杰) is a Chinese software engineer, technology
 Xu Zongheng (许宗衡; born 1955) was the mayor of Shenzhen, Guangdong, China
 Xu Zhiyong (许志永; born 1973) is a Chinese civil rights activist and formerly a lecturer at the Beijing University of Post and Telecommunications
 Xu Jianping (許建平; 1955- 2015) was a Chinese international football player
 Xu Guangda (许光达; 1908 – 1969) was a People's Liberation Army general who was conferred the Da Jiang (Grand General) rank in 1955
 Cho-yun Hsu (許倬雲; born 1930) is a Chinese American historian
 Xu Shiyou (许世友; born 1905–1985) was a general in the Chinese People's Liberation Army
 Xu Yan (judoka) (许岩; born 1981 in Beijing) is a female Chinese judoka
 Xu Keqiong (許可瓊) was a general of the Chinese Five Dynasties and Ten Kingdoms Period state Chu
 Xu Zhihong (许智宏; born 1942) is a Chinese botanist and former President of Peking University
 Greg Hsu (許光漢, born 1990), also known as Greg Han or Hsu Kuang-han, is a Taiwanese actor and model
 Hsu Tzong-li (許宗力; pinyin: Xǔ Zōnglì; born 10 February 1956) is a Taiwanese judge
 Xu Mian; born 1987 in Yangzhou) is a former female Chinese diver
 Xu Shiyou (许世友; 1905–1985) was a general in the Chinese People's Liberation Army
 Shue Ming-fa (born 1950), Taiwanese cyclist
 Shue Ming-shu (born 1940), Taiwanese cyclist
 Vivienne Shue (born 1944), American sinologist
 Kenneth Hsu (許靖華; born 1929, is a Chinese scientist and geologist
 Xu Heng (許衡; 1209–1281) was a Confucianist and educator of the Yuan Dynasty in China
 Khaw Boon Wan MP (許文遠; born 1952) is a Singaporean politician
 Xu Jiajun (许嘉俊; born 1995) is a Chinese footballer
 Xu Qing (许晴; born 1969), known also as Summer Qing, is a Chinese actress
 Xu Bo (许博; born 1985 in Shenyang) is a Chinese footballer
 Shi Wen-long or Hsu Wen-lung (許文龍; born 1928, Tainan Prefecture, Japanese-era Taiwan) a Taiwanese businessman and the founder of Chi Mei Corporation
 Xu You (hermit) (許由) was a legendary Chinese recluse who lived during the reign of Emperor Yao (traditionally c. 2356–2255 BC) and was allegedly offered the royal throne
 Xu Xi (許素細) Hong Kong writer
 William Shu (許子祥) Taiwanese-American entrepreneur based in the UK, founder of Deliveroo
 Xu Xinwen (许馨文; born 1995) Chinese singer, dancer, and actress
 Koh Ngiap Yong (许业荣; 1958-2000), Singaporean murder victim
Khor Kok Soon (许国顺), Singaporean gunman

See also
Heo (Korean name)
Cojuangco

References

External links
许姓来源及郡望堂号
许氏网:网聚天下许氏 传承许氏文化
民都鲁高陽許氏公會:Xǔ group in Malaysia

Chinese-language surnames